Danijel Zagorac (born 7 February 1987) is a Croatian professional football player who plays as a goalkeeper for Dinamo Zagreb.

Honours

Club
RNK Split
 Croatian Second Football League: 2009–10

Dinamo Zagreb
 Croatian First Football League: 2017–18, 2018–19, 2019–20, 2020–21
 Croatian Cup: 2016–17, 2017–18, 2020–21
 Croatian Football Super Cup: 2019

References

External links
 
GNK Dinamo Zagreb Profile

1987 births
Living people
Sportspeople from Drniš
Association football goalkeepers
Croatian footballers
RNK Split players
GNK Dinamo Zagreb players
NK Lokomotiva Zagreb players
Croatian Football League players